Jalalabad (also Romanized as Jalālābād; also known as Olang-e Shāhī) is a village in Abravan Rural District, Razaviyeh District, Mashhad County, Razavi Khorasan Province, Iran. At the 2006 census, its population was 541, in 134 families.

References 

Populated places in Mashhad County